ZeroPaid.com is a website concerning news, computer software, community, and file sharing. It offers news, software reviews, links, and a user forum. Its main news staff consists of Jared Moya since 2005 and Drew Wilson since 2007.

History
ZeroPaid, a technology news and software review portal, was launched in by Jorge Gonzalez and Chris Hedgecock. Zeropaid's early focus was on the Peer-to-peer space including everything related to File sharing, Napster, Gnutella, Usenet, and BitTorrent.

Early popularity can be attributed to features like the Gnutella "server of the moment," which allowed users to connect to a node of the decentralized network. This feature has since been built into desktop clients.

ZeroPaid gained notoriety in 2000 for its "Wall of Shame" listing of IP addresses from users who attempted to download child pornography from the Gnutella P2P network.  The site continues to be a source of original content and analysis.  The website features interviews including those with WinMXWorld, FilesTube, the Open Rights Group, the Pirate Party of Canada, the Free Software Foundation, Renaud Veeckman, Russell McOrmond and Michael Geist.

ZeroPaid has developed into a news & technology website featuring daily news on tech and copyright, free software catalog, and user forums. The website has been mentioned and its founders quoted in The Economist, eonline.com, USA Today, and Wired.

References

External links
 
 Tech News Website
 3rd Party Gnutella Reference

American technology news websites
BitTorrent
File sharing communities
Internet properties established in 2000
File sharing news sites